California Blues is the 14th and last studio album of the band Spirit, due to the death of guitarist/singer/songwriter Randy California one month after its release.

Track listing 
All songs written by Randy California except noted.

Personnel

Spirit 
 Randy California - guitar, vocals
 Ed Cassidy - drums, vocals
 Matt Andes - slide guitar
 Steve Loria - bass
 Rachel Andes - vocals

Guests 
 Robbie Krieger - guitar
 John Locke - piano
 Spencer Davis - guitar, vocals
 Bob Nichols - drums (track 3) "The River"
 Denise (Gula) Schriedel - Keyboards/Strings (Track 4) "Call on Me"

References

External links
 

Spirit (band) albums
1996 albums